MTV Unplugged is part of the MTV Unplugged series and the second live album of German hip hop group Die Fantastischen Vier. The group were the second German-speaking artists to make an appearance on MTV Unplugged, after Herbert Grönemeyer in 1995. Contrary to the wishes of the producers, the concert was not recorded in MTV studios in London, but in the Balver Höhle (Balver cave), a cave in the Sauerland used mainly for Balver Märchenwochen.

The album peaked at No. 6 in the German charts as wells as at No. 7 and No. 18 in Austria and Switzerland.

Track listing 
"Neues Land" - 3:16
"Die Stadt die es nicht gibt" - 4:47
"Der Picknicker" - 4:23
"Jetzt geht's ab" - 3:07
"Hammer" - 4:55
"Raus" - 4:17
"Millionen Legionen" - 6:14
"Le Smou" - 4:30
"Ganz normal" - 3:33
"Sie ist weg" - 3:54
"Tag am Meer" - 5:05
"Weiter als du denkst" - 5:13
"Konsum" - 4:26
"Buenos Dias Messias" - 4:50
"Schizophren" - 4:52
"MfG" - 4:17

Additional musicians
Flo Dauner
Lillo Scrimalli
Markus Kössler
Roland Peil
Markus Birkle
Michael Heupel
Anja Bukovec
Marko Hval
Gareth Lubbe
Maike Schmersahl
Ruben Mesado
Mirjam Trück
Razvan Popovici
Gabriel Mesado
Matthias Trück
Emanuela Simeonova
Manu & Matei Constantin

Singles

References

External links
 Official website (in German)
 discography at Discogs

Die Fantastischen Vier albums
Mtv Unplugged (Fantastischen Vier, Die Album)
2000 live albums